The book Mathematical Foundations of Quantum Mechanics (1932) by John von Neumann is an important early work in the development of quantum theory.

Publication history
The book was originally published in German in 1932 by Julius Springer, under the title .
An English translation by Robert T. Beyer was published in 1955 by Princeton University Press.
A Russian translation, edited by N. Bogolyubov, was published by Nauka in 1964.
A new English edition, edited by Nicholas A. Wheeler, was published in 2018 by Princeton University Press.

Significance
The book mainly summarizes results that von Neumann had published in earlier papers.
Its main significance may be its argument against the idea of hidden variables, on thermodynamic grounds.

See also
 Mathematical formulation of quantum mechanics
 Quantum Theory: Concepts and Methods

References

External links

 Full online text of the 1932 German edition (facsimile) at the University of Göttingen.

1932 non-fiction books
Mathematics books
Physics textbooks
Quantum mechanics